Chaudeyrolles is a commune in the Haute-Loire department in south-central France.

Geography
The river Lignon du Velay has its source in the commune.

Population

See also
Communes of the Haute-Loire department

References

Communes of Haute-Loire
Vivarais